Charlotte Gilbertson (November 11, 1922 – April 12, 2014) was an American painter and printmaker.

Artistic influences
Charlotte's artistic inspirations are rooted in Greek mythology, the French artist Paul Cézanne, Fernand Léger's modern abstractionism, and neo-Primitivist representations of the people of Papua New Guinea.

Biography

Childhood and early years 
Born in Boston on Armistice Day, Gilbertson was the eldest of four children and the only daughter in her family. Her father was a Methodist minister in the neighborhood of Roslindale, Boston, Massachusetts, where her family resided. As a child, her family lived primarily in Roslindale and spent their summers on Cape Cod
at their summer residence.

Post WWII, Paris and the GI Bill (1946 - 1951)
Gilbertson enlisted in the Armed Forces during WWII as a psychiatric social worker, stationed on Long Island, New York and in Georgia. After the war, she had access to the G.I. Bill of Rights, as did many of the war veterans of her generation. Charlotte used it to promote her education. She graduated from Boston University’s School of Fine Arts in 1948 and then moved to New York to be among notable artists. New York City was brimming over with abstract expressionist painters at the time, but she was more interested in "constructive design" not found in America. Charlotte wanted to develop a stronger sense of "design" in her work, to engage "the new" and "the modern".

In 1949, Gilbertson went to Paris on an artistic quest, fascinated by Cézanne's rendering of the Provençal apple. She studied "le dessin" under the French artist Fernand Léger at his Paris atelier. She found a master in Léger. (He jokingly referred to her as "la petite marine", or "the little sailor", because she wore dungarees, which was unusual for a woman at the time).

The New York years (1951–1979) 
Once she had begun to master a sense of color, space, and design on a canvas, she returned to New York City in 1951, where she lived for several years. Charlotte Gilbertson found employment in an array of diverse positions to sustain herself in New York City.

During the winters, she worked; during the summers, she painted. This seasonal cycle of employment and painting lasted from 1951 to 1974 and again from 1977 to 1979. From 1962 to 1974, Charlotte most notably worked as an assistant director and, later, as director of the Alexander Iolas Gallery in New York City. Through the Iolas Gallery, Charlotte met and befriended Andy Warhol and appeared in Warhol's film, Kiss).

World travel and travels, interrupted
In 1976, Gilbertson took a polar route around the world, following the sun, and spent over a year traveling the world, visiting Japan, Hong Kong, Australia, Bali, Burma, India, Nepal, the Middle East, Turkey and Greece. She also revisited much of Europe, including a special trip to the North Cape and a tour of Finland, Sweden and Norway. The Japanese use of iridescent colors and the mountain landscapes of Japan and Bali influenced her paintings during this time. Her excursions were curtailed in 1980 when she took care of her elderly parents until they died.

World travels resumed, new artistic influences
In 1990, Gilbertson resumed her travels to many other countries, including Belize and Tikal. She also spent a considerable amount of time in Fiji, Papua New Guinea, Australia, as well as Bali, India and Nepal. Her explorations in Nepal include treks of the Annapurna Circuit and safaris by an elephant in Nepal's Chitwan National Park.

She spent time in Tibet, Thailand, Malaysia and Singapore, ending her journeys in Western Europe with extended time in Paris and London before returning home. Her travels in South Asia significantly influenced her artwork from then onward. In particular, many of her paintings in the 1990s featured neo-Primitivist representations of the people of Papua New Guinea.

Later years
Gilbertson continued as an active painter, working with mixed media and doing small works on paper and canvas. She did a number of line drawings and a number of series of works on paper. She completed a series of work on her memory-impressions of Papua New Guinea, 50" x 72". She also completed a series of work on wood panels, employing gold leaf and other mixed media.

Exhibitions

Professional associations and listings 
Gilbertson was included in Who's Who in America (2002). She is also a lifetime member of the Visual Arts and Galleries Association.

Notes 
[1] In 1952, a pair of Léger murals was installed in the General Assembly Hall of the United Nations headquarters in New York, New York. Some of Léger's works are found at the Museum of Modern Art (MOMA) in New York City. In November 2003, his painting, La femme en rouge et vert, sold for $22,407,500 USD, and his sculptures have been selling in excess of 8 million dollars. (See the entry of Fernand Léger under his legacy).

[2] Opened by the French artist himself, the Alexander Iolas Gallery was located near 15 E. 55th Street in Manhattan, New York City. A host of international expatriate artists and avant-garde artists of the 1960s and early 1970s were invited to display their work there. Some of these artists included William Copley, Roberto Matta, Edward Ruscha and Niki de Saint Phalle.

References

 Gilbertson, Charlotte; Bodley Gallery (New York, N.Y.); Charlotte Gilbertson (exhibition): Bodley Gallery, New York City (New York : The Gallery, 1971) OCLC 10480617
 Gilbertson, Charlotte. Papua New Guinea : liklik hap (Harwich Port, MA : CWEB Press, 1998) OCLC: 42673043
 Opitz, Glenn B., ed., "Mantle Fielding's Dictionary of American Painters, Sculptors, and Engravers" (Poughkeepsie, NY : Apollo,1983)

External links

Andy Warhol Filmography listing Charlotte Gilbertson in the movie Kiss

.

1922 births
2014 deaths
American women painters
American printmakers
Artists from Boston
Painters from Massachusetts
American women printmakers
People from Roslindale
21st-century American women